Johnny Eblen (born December 13, 1991) is an American professional mixed martial artist currently signed to Bellator MMA, where he is the current Bellator Middleweight Champion. As of March 14, 2023, he is #6 in the Bellator men's pound-for-pound rankings.

Background
Eblen, born to a Korean mother and American father, was a state wrestling champion while at Park Hill High School in Kansas City. He has an older brother, Tommy, who is also a mixed martial artist. Eblen wrestled collegiately at the University of Missouri, where he became a NCAA qualifier in 2015 and a two-time Academic All-MAC Team member, posting three 20-win campaigns and compiled an 87-24 career record. His time in college was also marked with injuries, as in the summer prior to college, Eblen suffered a fractured fibula and also tore several ligaments in his ankle, forcing him to redshirt his freshman season. In his sophomore season, Eblen suffered extreme dehydration during a 7-mile run ended up in the ICU for three days, before less than a month after he tore his meniscus in his left knee, requiring another surgery. Before his junior year, he suffered a dislocated right shoulder which would eventually lead him his season ending before the start of the MAC Tournament after reinjuring it. In his senior season, he cut down to 174, and was a starter on No.1 ranked Tigers, becoming a NCAA qualifier.

After graduation from Missouri in 2015, Eblen relocated to Florida to take a non-MMA related job, working full time at a paving company and coaching wrestling on the side. When he met Steve Mocco, a former Olympic wrestler and American Top Team coach, at a wrestling practice, he was invited to visit ATT to check it out.

Mixed martial arts career

Early career
Eblen started his professional MMA career under the banner of Shamrock FC, making his debut at Shamrock FC 291, winning the bout against Wayne Collier via TKO in the first round. Eblen would defeated his next two opponents, Raymond Gray and Wayman Carter, via first round stoppages at Shamrock FC 298 and Shamrock FC 308 respectively, before winning what would be his last bout for the promotion at Shamrock FC 310, via unanimous decision against Tyler Lee .

Bellator MMA
Eblen made his promotional debut against Chauncey Foxworth on March 22, 2019 at Bellator 218. He won the bout via unanimous decision.

In his sophomore performance against Mauricio Alonso on October 4, 2019 at Bellator 229, he won the bout via unanimous decision.

Eblen faced Taylor Johnson on October 29, 2020 at Bellator 250, winning the bout via unanimous decision.

Picking up his first stoppage victory with the promotion, Eblen knocked out Daniel Madrid in the first round on May 7, 2021 at Bellator 258.

As the first bout of his new four-fight contract, Eblen faced Travis Davis on July 16, 2021 at Bellator 262. He won the bout via unanimous decision.

In his 6th bout with the promotion, Eblen defeated Collin Huckbody on December 3, 2021 at Bellator 272 via first round TKO stoppage.

As the first bout his new six-fight contract, Eblen faced John Salter on March 12, 2022 at Bellator 276. He won the bout via unanimous decision.

Bellator Middleweight champion
Eblen faced Gegard Mousasi for the Bellator Middleweight Championship at Bellator 282 on June 24, 2022. He won the bout and the title via a 50-45 unanimous decision on all judges' scorecards. Following this victory, Eblen was ranked as the fourth best middleweight by Fight Matrix and eight by Sherdog.

Eblen made his first title defense against Anatoly Tokov on February 4, 2023, at Bellator 290. He won the bout via unanimous decision.

Championships and accomplishments

Mixed martial arts 

 Bellator MMA
 Bellator Middleweight  World Championship  (One time; current)
One Successful Title Defence

Mixed martial arts record

|-
|Win
|align=center|13–0
|Anatoly Tokov
|Decision (unanimous)
|Bellator 290
|
|align=center|5
|align=center|5:00
|Inglewood, California, United States
|
|-
|Win
|align=center|12–0
|Gegard Mousasi
|Decision (unanimous)
|Bellator 282
|
|align=center|5
|align=center|5:00
|Uncasville, Connecticut, United States
|
|-
|Win
|align=center|11–0
|John Salter
|Decision (unanimous)
|Bellator 276
|
|align=center|3 
|align=center|5:00 
|St. Louis, Missouri, United States
|
|-
|Win
|align=center|10–0
|Collin Huckbody
|TKO (punches)
|Bellator 272
|
|align=center|1
|align=center|1:11
|Uncasville, Connecticut, United States
|
|-
|Win
|align=center|9–0
|Travis Davis
|Decision (unanimous)
|Bellator 262
|
|align=center|3
|align=center|5:00
|Uncasville, Connecticut, United States
|
|-
|Win
|align=center|8–0
|Daniel Madrid
|KO (punches)
|Bellator 258
|
|align=center|1
|align=center|2:44
|Uncasville, Connecticut, United States
|
|-
|Win
|align=center|7–0
|Taylor Johnson
|Decision (unanimous)
|Bellator 250
|
|align=center|3
|align=center|5:00
|Uncasville, Connecticut, United States
|
|-
|Win
|align=center|6–0
|Mauricio Alonso
|Decision (unanimous)
|Bellator 229
|
|align=center|3
|align=center|5:00
|Temecula, California, United States
|
|-
|Win
|align=center|5–0
|Chauncey Foxworth
|Decision (unanimous)
|Bellator 218
|
|align=center|3
|align=center|5:00
|Thackerville, Oklahoma, United States
|
|-
|Win
|align=center|4–0
|Tyler Lee
|TKO (submission to punches)
|Shamrock FC 310
|
|align=center|1
|align=center|2:14
|Kansas City, Missouri, United States
|
|-
|Win
|align=center|3–0
|Wayman Carter
|Submission (guillotine choke)
|Shamrock FC 308
|
|align=center|1
|align=center|1:37
|St. Louis, Missouri, United States
|
|-
|Win
|align=center|2–0
|Raymond Gray
|TKO (submission to punches)
|Shamrock FC 298
|
|align=center|1
|align=center|2:21
|Kansas City, Missouri, United States
|
|-
|Win
|align=center|1–0
|Wayne Collier
|TKO (submission to punches)
|Shamrock FC 291
|
|align=center|1
|align=center|1:01
|Kansas City, Missouri, United States
|
|-

Amateur mixed martial arts record

|-
|Win
|align=center| 3–0
|Gustavo Trujillo
|Decision (unanimous)
|XFN 12: Tournament of Titans
|
|align=center|3
|align=center|3:00
|Fort Lauderdale, Florida, United States
|
|-
|Win
|align=center| 2–0
|Denzel Freeman
|Decision (unanimous)
|AFC 13
|
|align=center|3
|align=center|3:00
|New Port Richey, Florida, United States
|
|-
|Win
|align=center| 1–0
|Tyler Carey
|Submission (rear-naked choke)
|Undisputed Florida Fighting Championship 5
|
|align=center|1
|align=center|2:00
|West Palm Beach, Florida, United States
|

See also
 List of current Bellator fighters
 List of male mixed martial artists
 List of undefeated mixed martial artists

References

External links 
  
  

1991 births
Living people
American male mixed martial artists
Middleweight mixed martial artists
Mixed martial artists utilizing collegiate wrestling
American male sport wrestlers
Amateur wrestlers
People from Des Moines, Iowa
Bellator male fighters